is a Japanese singer-songwriter. She began her career in 2001 with the release of the single "Itoshigo yo" when she was signed with Toshiba-EMI. She has released twelve albums and eleven singles. Rurutia is intensely private; most aspects of her life – including her real name, date of birth, and hometown, are kept private, and she has never appeared on a TV program or held a live concert since her debut. Her mass media appearances have been limited to broadcasts of the Internet radio program "RURUTIA Planet," which began streaming on her official website after she became independent, interviews with photos posted on her official website, and interviews in music magazines. As for avoiding media exposure, she cites the glamorous world of the public spotlight and her own musical world as being at odds with each other. This, added to her whispered vocals, creates a unique and mysterious artistic persona.

Her pseudonym, Rurutia, is derived from the Tahitian word 'rorotea' meaning "blissful rain".

Discography

Singles 
 Itoshigo yo [愛し子よ] (6 October 2001)
 Lost Butterfly [ロスト バタフライ] (6 December 2001)
 Yuruginai Utsukushii Mono [ゆるぎない美しいもの] (26 June 2002)
 Suzaku no Sora [朱雀の空] (30 September 2002)
 Shine [シャイン] (22 January 2003)
 Träumerei [トロイメライ] (29 October 2003)
 Primary [プライマリー] (2 March 2005)
 Spinel [スピネル] (21 November 2005)
 Hohoemi no MARIA [微笑みのマリア] (26 January 2006)
 Reirei Tenohira [玲々テノヒラ] (31 May 2006)
 Pluie [プリュイ] (26 June 2013)
 Don't Look at The Color (18 November 2015)
 Deeply (06 May 2020)

Albums 
 R° (6 March 2002)
 エレメンツ (Elements)
 知恵の実 (Chie no Mi/A Fruit of Knowledge)
 愛し子よ (Itoshigo yo/My Beloved Child)
 ロスト バタフライ (Lost Butterfly)
 赤いろうそく (Akai Rōsoku/A Red Candle)
 雨の果て (Ame no Hate/The End of the Rain)
 僕の宇宙 君の海 (Boku no Uchū Kimi no Umi/My Universe, Your Ocean)
 僕らの箱庭 (Bokura no Hakoniwa/Our Miniature Garden)
 銀の炎 (Gin no Honoo/Silver Flame)
 ハートダンス (Heart Dance)
 Water Forest (26 February 2003)
 パヴァーヌ (Pavane)
 朱雀の空 (Suzaku no Sora/Sky of Suzaku)
 オール (Oar)
 星のたましい (Hoshi no Tamashii/Star Souls)
 サンクチュアリ (Sanctuary)
 ゆるぎない美しいもの (Yuruginai Utsukushii Mono/Unwavering Beautiful Thing)
 幻惑の風 (Genwaku no Kaze/A Bewitching Wind)
 シャイン (Shine)
 満ちる森 (Michiru Mori/The Forest Full of Sorrow)
 思季 (Shiki/Thinking about the Seasons)
 Promised Land / プロミスト・ランド (9 June 2004)
 ハレルヤ (Hallelujah)
 neo
 アラベスク (Arabesque)
 シンシア (Cynthia)
 トロイメライ (Träumerei/Fantasy)
 ジゼル (Giselle)
 流れ星 (Nagareboshi/Shooting Star)
 メリー (Merry)
 GOLA 
 月千一夜 (Tsuki Sen'ichiya/One Thousand and One Moonlit Nights)
 maururu roa('thank you very much' in Tahitian)
 Meme / ミーム (13 April 2005)
 Dancing Meme
 tone
 リラが散っても (Rira ga Chitte mo/Even if the Lilacs Drop)
 プライマリー(album ver.)(Primary)
 シグナル (Signal)
 スカーレット (Scarlet)
 セレナイト (Selenite)
 ヒースの楽園 (Heath no Rakuen/Paradise in the Heath)
 青い薔薇 (Aoi Bara/Blue Rose)
 蝶ノ森 (Chō no Mori/Butterfly Forest)
 コバルトの星 (Cobalt no Hoshi/Cobalt Stars)
 Sleeping Meme
 Kazuo Umezu's Horror Theater / 楳図かずお恐怖劇場 (film soundtrack, 21 June 2005)
 蝶ノ森(オープニングテーマ-cinema track-) (Chō no Mori) 	
 ハレルヤ (Hallelujah)
 トロイメライ (Träumerei)
 蝶ノ森 (Chō no Mori)
 知恵の実 (Chie no Mi)
 パヴァーヌ (Pavane)
 エレメンツ (Elements)
 満ちる森 (Michiru Mori)
 僕の宇宙　君の海 (Boku no Uchū Kimi no Umi)
 僕らの箱庭 (Bokura no Hakoniwa)
 neo
 コバルトの星 (Cobalt no Hoshi)
 エレメンツ (Elements)
 サンクチュアリ (Sanctuary)
 コバルトの星(エンディングテーマ－cinema track-) (Cobalt no Hoshi)
 Chorion (8 November 2006)
 ABINTRA
 玲々テノヒラ (Reirei Tenohira/Midas Touch)
 星に花、灰色の雨 (Album ver) (Hoshi ni Hana, Hai-iro no Ame/Flowers for a Star, and the Grey Rain)
 水景色　星模様 (Mizugeshiki Hoshimoyō/Water Scenery, Star Patterns)
 願いの届く日 (Negai no Todoku Hi/The Day Our Wishes Come True)
 スピネル (Spinel)
 Time Traveler
 パレード (Parade)
 微笑みのマリア (Hohoemi no MARIA/Smiling Virgin Mary)
 マグノリアの情景 (Magnolia no Joukei/The Landscape Of Magnolias)
 ABINTRA (Inst)
 水景色　星模様(Inst) (Mizugeshiki Hoshimoyō)
 願いの届く日 (Inst) (Negai No Todoku Hi)
 スピネル (Inst) (Spinel)
 微笑みのマリア (Inst) (Hohoemi No Maria)
 Opus (27 June 2007)
 Opus
 流光 (Ryuukou/Flowing Light)
 水景色　星模様 (Ballade Ver) (Mizugeshiki Hoshimoyō)
 愛し子よ(Ballade Ver) (Itoshigo Yo)
 アラベスク(Ballade Ver) (Arabesque)
 星と羽  (Hoshi to Hane/Stars and Feathers)
 Opus (Music Box) *Bonus Track
 流光 (Music Box) *Bonus Track
 氷鎖 (Hyousa/Frozen Chain) (30 April 2008)
 氷鎖 (Hyousa/Frozen Chain)
 無憂歌 (Muyuu Ka/A Song of Fearlessness)
 Opus (Ballad Ver)
 銀の炎 (Balad Ver) (Gin no Honoo)
 星のたましい (Ballad Ver) (Hoshi no Tamashii)
 玲々テノヒラ (Ballad Ver) (Reirei Tenohira)
 氷鎖 (Music Box Ver) *Bonus Track
 無憂歌 (Music Box Ver) *Bonus Track
 Seirios (27 February 2009)
 Seirios
 サイレントプレイヤー (Silent Prayers)
 Opus
 オーロラ飛行 (Aurora Hikou/Aurora Flight)
 流光 (Ryuukou)
 無憂歌 (Muyuu ka)
 LAST DAY
 氷鎖 (Hyousa)
 夢蛍 (Yume Hotaru/Dream Firefly)
 VOID
 星と羽 (Hoshi to Hane)
 Behind the blue (7 October 2010)
 Behind the blue
 Rainbow
 花綴り(silky jazz ver) (Hana Tsuzuri/Spelling with Flowers)
 夢蛍(candle night remix) (Yume Hotaru) 
 Rainbow (alegria dance remix) 
 Behind the blue (midnight story remix) 
 LAST DAY(autumn moon remix)  
 Behind the blue(Instrumental) 
 Rainbow (Instrumental)
 RESONANCE (27 April 2011)
 RESONANCE
 Invitation
 深　藍 (Shin'ai/Deep Blue)
 RESONANCE (acoustic ver) 
 Invitation (acoustic ver) 
 深　藍 (Ballad ver) 
 RESONANCE (Instrumental) 
 Invitation(Instrumental) 
 深　藍  (Instrumental)
 Node From R (5 September 2012)
 Aperture
 The Name Of Anger
 Mystic Pendulum
 Behind the blue
 スペクトル (Spectrum)
 Invitation
 In The Majority
 深　藍 (Shin'ai)
 アイリス (Iris)
 I Keep On Lovin' you
 Rainbow
 Mystic Pendulum ~The Rusty Veil Ver.~
 一粒の灯火 (Hitotsubu no Tomoshibi/Single Grain of Light)
 RESONANCE
 Lullaby

References

External links 
 
 
 

Japanese women musicians
Japanese women singers
Japanese-language singers
Living people
Year of birth missing (living people)